Jane Eileen Murphy Timken (born November 5, 1966) is an American attorney who served as chair of the Ohio Republican Party from 2017 to 2021. She was a candidate in the 2022 United States Senate election in Ohio.

Early life and education 
Timken was born Jane Eileen Murphy in Cincinnati, Ohio, the daughter of John and Eileen Murphy. Her father was a law professor and her mother was a Scottish-born nurse. Timken graduated from Walnut Hills High School.

Timken graduated from Harvard College with a degree in psychology and played rugby while she was there. She received her Juris Doctor, summa cum laude, from the Washington College of Law at American University in Washington, D.C.

Career 

She served as vice chair of the Stark County Republican Party from May 2010 until she was elected as the first female chairwoman of the Ohio Republican Party in January 2017. While serving as Chair, Timken refused to sign a pledge stating the GOP would not use hacked information in campaigns.

During the race, she sought to present herself as a Donald Trump loyalist, mirrored his talking points and said she would "advance the Trump agenda". In her announcement speech for the 2022 campaign, she attacked John Kasich, the Republican former Governor of Ohio. In 2016, she had initially supported Kasich in the 2016 Republican presidential primary.

She remained chair until resigning in February 2021 to run for U.S. Senate in the 2022 election, following the announcement that incumbent Republican Rob Portman would not seek re-election.

Personal life 
Timken lives in Stark County, Ohio with her husband Ward J. "Tim" Timken Jr., the former chairman, CEO, and president of TimkenSteel. She has two children. Her uncle-in-law, William R. Timken, is a former United States ambassador to Germany.

References

External links
 Campaign website

1966 births
2020 United States presidential electors
American people of Scottish descent
Harvard University alumni
Living people
Ohio Republicans
State political party chairs of Ohio
Washington College of Law alumni
Women in Ohio politics
21st-century American women politicians
Candidates in the 2022 United States Senate elections
21st-century American politicians